Chile competed at the 1996 Summer Olympics in Atlanta, United States. 21 competitors, 16 men and 5 women, took part in 18 events in 10 sports.

Athletics

Men's 200 metres
Sebastián Keitel

Men's Marathon
 Marcelo Barrientos — 2:31.05 (→ 86th place)

Men's Shot Put
Gert Weil

Women's Marathon
 Erika Olivera — 2:39.06 (→ 37th place)

Boxing

Men's Middleweight (– 75 kg)
Ricardo Araneda
 First Round — Lost to Akaki Kakauridze (Georgia), 3-10

Cycling

Fencing

One male fencer represented Chile in 1996.

Men's épée
 Paris Inostroza

Sailing

Shooting

Swimming

Men's 100m Backstroke
Nicolás Rajcevich
 Heat — ??? (→ did not advance, 44th place)

Men's 200m Backstroke
Nicolás Rajcevich
 Heat — 2:05.79 (→ did not advance, 27th place)

Table tennis

Tennis

Women's doubles
Paula Cabezas and Bárbara Castro

Weightlifting

See also
Chile at the 1995 Pan American Games

References

External links
Official Olympic Reports

Nations at the 1996 Summer Olympics
1996 Summer Olympics
1996 in Chilean sport